Calcancora is an extinct genus of sea cucumber which existed in Poland during the Triassic period, Germany during the upper Jurassic period, France, Brazil, and the United States during the Paleogene period, and Austria during the Tortonian period. The type species is Calcancora mississippiensis.

References

Apodida
Extinct animals of Europe
Triassic echinoderms
Anisian first appearances
Tortonian extinctions
Jurassic echinoderms
Cretaceous echinoderms
Paleogene echinoderms
Neogene echinoderms
Prehistoric sea cucumber genera
Fossil taxa described in 1955